The post of Controller of the Navy (abbreviated as CofN) was originally created in 1859 when the Surveyor of the Navy's title changed to Controller of the Navy. In 1869 the controller's office was abolished and its duties were assumed by that of the Third Naval Lord whose title then changed to Third Naval Lord and Controller of the Navy. In 1904 the title was changed again to Third Sea Lord and Controller of the Navy. In 1965 the office of the Third Sea Lord was abolished. The post-holder is responsible for procurement and matériel in the British Royal Navy.

Originally the post-holder was a member of the Board of Admiralty and later a member of the Admiralty Board.

History
The original office of Comptroller of the Navy was established in 1561 during the reign of Elizabeth I of England which was a very different function from what became known later as the Controller of the Navy. They presided over the Navy Board from 1660, and generally superintended the business of the Navy Office, they were responsible for all naval spending and for the offices dealing with bills, accounts and wages during the sixteenth and seventeenth centuries. By the eighteenth century the principal officer responsible for estimating annual stores requirements, inspecting ships' stores and maintaining the Fleet's store-books and repair-bills was the Surveyor of the Navy however their duties passed increasingly to the Comptroller of the Navy during the latter half of this period. The office of the Surveyor did not altogether disappear. In 1805 for the first time, specific functions were assigned to each of the 'Naval' Lords, who were described as 'Professional' Lords, leaving to the civil lords to the routine business of signing off all official documents. In 1832 the original office of the Comptroller was abolished following a merger with the Board of Admiralty and the Surveyor was made the officer responsible under the First Sea Lord for the material departments. In 1859 the office the Surveyor of the Navy who had overall responsibility for ship design was renamed and the post became known as the Controller of the Navy.

In the re-organisation of the Admiralty by Order in Council of 14 January 1869, the Controller of the Navy was given a seat on the Board of Admiralty as the Third Lord and Controller of the Navy. They also inherited the new duties of the Storekeeper-General of the Navy, whose post was abolished. The Controller lost the title of Third Lord and the seat on the board by an Order in Council of 19 March 1872, but regained them by a further Order in Council of 10 March 1882. In 1872 they again became subordinate to the First Sea Lord, but had the right to attend board meetings when the business of the department was under discussion. In 1882 the Controller again became independent of the First Sea Lord and became a board member again as Third Naval Lord and Controller. The Third Naval Lord's post was renamed to become known as the Third Sea Lord and Controller in 1904. The appointment of Controller of the Navy was abolished in September 1912, although that of Third Sea Lord remained. Thereafter, except for a period in 1917 to 1918 when there was a civilian Controller, the titles of Third Sea Lord and Controller of the Navy went together.

The Third Sea Lord and Controller was mainly responsible for superintending the work of the Royal Naval Scientific Service and for a number of Admiralty departments, including those of the Department of the Director of Naval Construction, (from 1958 the Department of the Director General Ships), of the Department of the Engineer in Chief (formerly the Steam Department), of the Department of the Director of Naval Ordnance, of the Department of the Director of Dockyards and, following a board decision in 1911, of the Admiralty Compass Observatory, formerly under the control of the Hydrographer's Department War they also had responsibility for the supply of equipment to Combined Operations Headquarters. From 1958 the Fourth Sea Lord was also known as Vice Controller of the Navy they assumed the superintendence of the naval dockyard organisation and the maintenance of the fleet. In 1965 the appointment of Third Sea Lord was abolished and the individual responsible for the materiel side of the navy became simply Controller of the Navy. From 2003 until April 2013 the post holder jointly held different titles such as ( Director, Land Maritime, 2003–2006, Director-General, Nuclear, 2006–2009, Capability Manager/Director (Precision Attack), 2009-2012 and Director, Maritime Capability and Transformation, 2012–2013. From April 2013 until November 2018 the post holder simultaneously held the titles of Assistant Chief of the Naval Staff (Capability) and Chief of Staff Navy Command (HQ) post holders include: From November 2018, the post holder has been just Assistant Chief of the Naval Staff (Capability). ACNS Capability is also known as Director Develop as of September 2020.

List of office holders

Third Naval Lords 1832–1868
 Rear Admiral Sir Samuel Pechell 1832–1834
 Rear Admiral Sir Charles Rowley 1834–1835
 Rear Admiral Sir George Elliot 1835–1837
 Rear Admiral Sir Edward Troubridge 1837–1841
 Rear Admiral Sir Samuel Pechell 1841
 Rear Admiral Sir George Seymour 1841–1844
 Rear Admiral Sir William Bowles 1844–1846
 Rear Admiral Sir Maurice Berkeley 1846–1847
 Rear Admiral Lord John Hay 1847–1850
 Rear Admiral Sir Houston Stewart 1850–1852
 Rear Admiral Sir James Stirling 1852
 Rear Admiral Sir Thomas Herbert 1852–1853
 Rear Admiral Sir Richard Dundas 1853–1854
 Rear Admiral Sir Peter Richards 1854–1857
 Rear Admiral Henry Eden 1857
 Rear Admiral Sir Alexander Milne 1857–1859
 Rear Admiral Sir Henry Leeke 1859
 Rear Admiral Sir Charles Eden 1859–1861
 Rear Admiral Charles Frederick 1861–1865
 Rear Admiral Sir Edward Fanshawe 1865–1866
 Rear Admiral Henry Seymour 1866–1868

Third Lords and Controllers of the Navy 1869–1872
 Admiral Sir Robert Robinson, 1869–1871
 Captain Robert Hall, 1871–1872

Controllers of the Navy 1872–1882
 Captain Robert Hall, 1872
 Admiral Sir William Stewart, 1872–1881
 Rear-Admiral Thomas Brandreth, 1881–1882

Third Naval Lords and Controllers of the Navy 1882–1904
Third Naval Lords and Controllers of the Navy include:
 Vice-Admiral Thomas Brandreth, 1882–1886
 Vice-Admiral Sir William Graham, 1886–1888
 Vice-Admiral John Hopkins, 1888–1892
 Vice-Admiral Sir John Fisher, 1892–1897
 Rear-Admiral Arthur Wilson, 1897–1901
 Rear-Admiral William May, 1901–1905

Third Sea Lord and Controllers of the Navy 1904–1912
 Rear-Admiral Sir Henry Jackson, 1905–1908
 Rear-Admiral Sir John Jellicoe, 1908–1910
 Rear-Admiral Charles Briggs, 1910–1912
 Rear-Admiral Gordon Moore, 1912

Third Sea Lords 1912–1918
 Rear-Admiral Gordon Moore, 1912–1914
 Rear-Admiral Frederick Tudor, 1914–1917
 Rear-Admiral Lionel Halsey, 1917–1918

Third Sea Lords and Controllers of the Navy 1918–1965
Third Sea Lords and Controllers of the Navy include:
 Rear-Admiral Sir Charles de Bartolomé, 1918–1919
 Rear-Admiral Sir William Nicholson, 1919–1920
 Rear-Admiral Sir Frederick Field, 1920–1923
 Rear-Admiral Cyril Fuller, 1923–1925
 Vice-Admiral Sir Ernle Chatfield, 1925–1928
 Vice-Admiral Roger Backhouse, 1928–1932
 Vice-Admiral Charles Forbes, 1932–1934
 Admiral Sir Reginald Henderson, 1934–1939
 Vice-Admiral Sir Bruce Fraser, 1939–1942
 Admiral Sir Frederic Wake-Walker, 1942–1945
 Vice-Admiral Sir Charles Daniel, 1945–1949
 Admiral Sir Michael Denny, 1949–1953
 Admiral Sir Ralph Edwards, 1953–1956
 Admiral Sir Peter Reid, 1956–1961
 Admiral Sir Michael Le Fanu, 1961–1965

Controllers of the Navy 1965–current
Post holders include:
 Admiral Sir Horace Law, 1965–1970
 Admiral Sir Michael Pollock, 1970–1971
 Admiral Sir Anthony Griffin, 1971–1975
 Admiral Sir Richard Clayton, 1975–1979
 Admiral Sir John Fieldhouse, 1979–1981
 Admiral Sir Lindsay Bryson, 1981–1984
 Admiral Sir Derek Reffell, 1984–1989
 Admiral Sir Kenneth Eaton, 1989–1994
 Vice-Admiral Sir Robert Walmsley, 1994–1996
 Rear-Admiral Frederick Scourse, 1996–1997
 Rear-Admiral Peter Spencer, 1997–2000
 Rear-Admiral Nigel Guild, 2000–2003
 Rear-Admiral Richard Cheadle, 2003–2006 also (also Director, Land Maritime)
 Rear-Admiral Andrew Mathews, 2006–2007 (also Director-General, Nuclear)
 Rear-Admiral Paul Lambert, 2007–2009 (ditto)
 Rear-Admiral Amjad Hussain, 2009–2012 (also Capability Manager/Director (Precision Attack))
 Rear-Admiral Henry Parker, 2012–2013 (also Director, Maritime Capability and Transformation)
 Rear-Admiral Duncan Potts, April 2013 – September 2014 
 Rear-Admiral James Morse, September 2014 – May 2016 
 Rear-Admiral Paul Bennett, May 2016 – November 2017 
 Major-General Robert Magowan, RM. November 2017 – November 2018 
 Rear-Admiral Hugh Beard, November 2018 – January 2020
 Rear-Admiral Andrew Burns, January 2020 – September 2021
 Rear-Admiral James Parkin, September 2021 – Present

Departments under the office
At various times included:

Current
 Office of the Assistant Chief of Staff Warfare
 Office of the Assistant Chief of Staff Information Superiority
 Office of the Assistant Chief of Staff Maritime Capability
 Office Assistant Chief of Staff Integrated Change Programme

Former
At various times included:
 Admiralty Compass Observatory, formerly under the control of the Hydrographer of the Navy's department
 Combined Operations Headquarters (supply of equipment only).
 Department of the Director of Dockyards, (1885–1954)
 Department of the Director of Naval Construction
 Royal Corps of Naval Constructors
 Department of the Director General Ships 
 Department of the Director Contract-built ships
 Department of the Director of Electrical Engineering
 Department of the Director of Naval Equipment
 Department of the Director of Scientific Research
 Department of the Engineer in Chief (formerly the Steam Department)
 Department of the Inspector of Dockyard Expense Accounts
 Department of the Director of Torpedoes and Mines
 Department of the Surveyor of Dockyards, (1872–1885)
 Directorate of Naval Construction, (1913–1958)
 Naval Ordnance Department 
 Department of the Assistant Director of Torpedoes
 Naval Ordnance Stores Department (1918–1964)
 Naval Stores Department, (1869–1966)
 Dockyards and Fleet Maintenance Department, (1957–1964)
 Department of Dockyards and Maintenance, (1964–1968)
 Office of the Assistant Controller 
 Office of the Assistant Controller Research and Development 
 Office of the Controller, (1917–1918)
 Office of the Deputy Controller of Navy, (1939–1941)
 Office of the Deputy Controller Production
 Office of the Inspector Gun Mountings
 Office of the Superintendent of Stores, (1869–1917)
 Office of the Vice Controller of the Navy, (1939–1945)
 Office of the Vice Controller Air
 Department of the Director of Naval Equipment
 Armament Supply Department, (1891–1918)
 Royal Naval Armaments Depot
 Department of the Chief Inspector of Naval Ordnance, (1908–1922)
 Naval Ordnance Inspection Department, (1922–1964)
 Royal Naval Scientific Service
 Steam Department

See also
 First Sea Lord
 Second Sea Lord
 Fourth Sea Lord
 Fifth Sea Lord
 Comptroller of the Navy, (1561–1832)

References

 
 

N